Simon Law (born 28 May 1961, in Luton, England) is a producer, keyboardist and songwriter for Soul II Soul.

Career
Law is an original member of Soul II Soul. The band had a #1 UK hit single with "Back to Life (However Do You Want Me)", where he appeared in one of the song's two music videos, and a Top 10 hit with "Keep On Movin'". The band were awarded two Grammys for the songs "Back to Life" and the instrumental "African Dance", both of which Law co-wrote. He worked on all subsequent Soul II Soul albums apart from Volume III Just Right, producing and co-writing many of the band's other UK hit singles, including "Missing You", "Love Enuff" and "Represent". He performs with the band regularly to this day and was on the Jools Holland show Later in November 2012.

Law is also a record producer who has worked with artists such as Chanté Moore ("Love's Taken Over"), James "J.T." Taylor, and Maxi Priest. He is also one half of electronic duo Una Mas, with production/remix partner Lee Hamblin. He is a member of the band Jen Schaffer and the Shiners, and is credited as a producer, mixer, and background vocalist on many of their songs. He is credited on recording releases as Simon A. Law, Simon "The Funky Ginger" Law, or simply The Funky Ginger.

References 

1961 births
Living people
English dance musicians
English rhythm and blues musicians
English keyboardists
English record producers
English songwriters
Soul II Soul members